Cotton leafworm may refer to:
Alabama argillacea
Spodoptera litura

Animal common name disambiguation pages